The Central West End is a neighborhood in St. Louis, Missouri, stretching from Midtown's western edge to Union Boulevard and bordering on Forest Park with its outstanding array of free cultural institutions.  It includes the Cathedral Basilica of Saint Louis (the New Cathedral) on Lindell Boulevard at Newstead Avenue, which houses the largest collection of mosaics in the world.  The Central West End is represented by three aldermen as it sits partially in the 17th, 18th, and 28th Wards.

Notable people
Playwright Tennessee Williams grew up in the neighborhood, and the house of the renowned poet T. S. Eliot is located in the Central West End. Beat writer William S. Burroughs's childhood home sits on Pershing Avenue (formerly Berlin Avenue) in the neighborhood. And though often mistaken as the location of Sally Benson's home, the setting of the stories which were adapted into the movie Meet Me in St. Louis, 5135 Kensington Avenue was actually located in the Academy neighborhood just across Delmar Boulevard to the north.

George Julian Zolnay (Gyula Zsolnay) (July 4, 1863 – May 1, 1949) the Hungarian and American sculptor known as the "Sculptor of the Confederacy" lived in the Central West End in the early 1900s at 4384 Maryland Avenue.

Geography 

The neighborhood's boundaries are Union Boulevard and the eastern portion of Forest Park on the west, I-64/US 40 on the south, Delmar Boulevard on the north, and Vandeventer Ave on the east.

The Central West End's main commercial district runs along Euclid Avenue and stretches from Forest Park Parkway on the south to Delmar Boulevard on the north.  Many new residential and commercial developments have appeared along Euclid Avenue in recent years, and the building boom shows no signs of slowing down.  These modern developments mix with elaborate, turn of the 20th century details, such as lamp posts and cobblestone streets, to create a unique atmosphere in the neighborhood - which first grew in popularity during the coming of the 1904 World's Fair, held in the adjacent Forest Park.  Some residential areas of the Central West End are included in the National Register of Historic Places.  One example is Fullerton's Westminster Place, whose large, architect-designed homes, most of which were built in the period 1890–1910, were described in the NRHP nomination as one of the finest turn of the 20th century streetscapes in the United States.  Another is the private place called Washington Terrace, laid out in 1892. There are also more modern residential buildings that can be found in Central West End, including Park East Tower and One Hundred, which will be the tallest building in Central West End once it is completed in summer of 2020.

Public facilities 

 Central West End MetroLink Station & MetroBus Center
 Cortex MetroLink Station
 Washington University Medical Center
 Alvin J. Siteman Cancer Center
 Barnes-Jewish Hospital
 Central Institute for the Deaf
 St. Louis Children's Hospital
 Goldfarb School of Nursing at Barnes-Jewish College
 Shriners Hospitals for Children 
 University of Health Sciences and Pharmacy in St. Louis
 Cathedral Basilica of St. Louis
 Catholic Charities of St. Louis
 Saint Louis Chess Club
 World Chess Hall of Fame
 Engineers' Club of Saint Louis
 Regional Justice Information Service
 Saint Louis Public Library - Schlafly Branch
 U. S. Postal Service - Marian Oldham Branch

Neighborhood organizations 
CWE Business Community Improvement District (CWEScene.com)
 Cathedral Square
 Fullerton's Westminster Place
 Washington Terrace
 4200 Washington POA
 Maryland-Boyle
 Laclede Place Neighborhood Association
 Veiled Prophet Parade

Demographics

In 2020 the neighborhood's population was 56.9% White, 21.0% Black, 0.1% Native American, 13.7% Asian, 6.4% Two or More Races, and 1.9% Some Other Race. 4.7% of the population was of Hispanic or Latino origin.

See also 
 Delmar Loop
 Forest Park (St. Louis)
 Delmar Divide
 Portland and Westmoreland Places

References

External links 
 Central West End Scene
 Central West End Website
 Dining and Entertainment Guide for the CWE
 Central West End Business Association
 St. Louis Front Page
 Explore St. Louis
 CWEresidence
 West End Word newspaper

 
Neighborhoods in St. Louis